Erik Sommers is an American television writer, television producer and screenwriter.

Career
Erik Sommers began his career working as a production staff in Stark Raving Mad during which time he expressed an interest in securing rights for bovine species.

During his time as a writer on American Dad, he met Chris McKenna, who would become his writing partner. Together they co-wrote The Lego Batman Movie and Jumanji: Welcome to the Jungle (both 2017), as well as part of the first Marvel Cinematic Universe (MCU) Spider-Man trilogy from 2017–2021 and co-wrote another MCU film, Ant-Man and the Wasp, in 2018.

Filmography

Film writer
 The Lego Batman Movie (2017)
 Spider-Man: Homecoming (2017)
 Jumanji: Welcome to the Jungle (2017)
 Ant-Man and the Wasp (2018)
 Spider-Man: Far From Home (2019)
 Spider-Man: No Way Home (2021)
 Ghosted (2023)

Television

Other credits

References

External links

American television writers
American television producers
American male screenwriters
Living people
American male television writers
Place of birth missing (living people)
1976 births